Benkara is a genus of flowering plants in the family Rubiaceae. It is found in tropical and subtropical Asia from India east to China and the Ryukyu Islands, south to Java and the Philippines. It was described by Michel Adanson in 1763.

Species 
 Benkara armigera (K.Schum.) Ridsdale - Thailand, Cambodia, Laos, Vietnam, Peninsular Malaysia 
 Benkara depauperata (Drake) Ridsdale - China, Vietnam
 Benkara emanuelssoniana (Lour.) Ridsdale - Palawan
 Benkara esculenta (Lour.) Ridsdale - Vietnam
 Benkara evenosa (Hutch.) Ridsdale - Yunnan
 Benkara fasciculata (Roxb.) Ridsdale - Assam, Bhutan, Nepal, India, Cambodia, Vietnam, Malaysia, Philippines 
 Benkara forrestii (J.Anthony) Ridsdale - Yunnan, Thailand
 Benkara griffithii (Hook.f.) Ridsdale - China, Assam, Bhutan
 Benkara hoaensis (Pierre ex Pit.) Ridsdale - Vietnam
 Benkara malabarica (Lam.) Tirveng - India, Sri Lanka
 Benkara microcarpa (Bartl. ex DC.) Ridsdale - Philippines
 Benkara miquelii (Koord. & Valeton) Ridsdale - Java
 Benkara ovoidea (Pierre ex Pit.) Ridsdale - Thailand, Laos, Cambodia, Vietnam 
 Benkara parviflora (King & Gamble) Ridsdale - Peninsular Malaysia 
 Benkara pierrei (Pit.) Ridsdale - Thailand, Vietnam
 Benkara rectispina (Merr.) Ridsdale - Hainan
 Benkara scandens (Thunb.) Ridsdale - China, Vietnam, Philippines
 Benkara sinensis (Lour.) Ridsdale - China, Taiwan, Thailand,  Vietnam, Nansei-shoto (Ryukyu Islands)

References

External links 
 Benkara in the World Checklist of Rubiaceae

Gardenieae
Rubiaceae genera
Taxa named by Michel Adanson